Job or No Job is an American reality television series that premiered on ABC Family on August 5, 2015. The show moved to Thursdays at 3pm/2c after two low-rated episodes.

Episodes

References

External links
 
 Job or No Job on TV.com
 

2010s American reality television series
2015 American television series debuts
2015 American television series endings
ABC Family original programming
English-language television shows
Television series by All3Media
Television series by Disney–ABC Domestic Television